The Canad Inns Men's Classic (formerly the Meyers Norris Penny Prairie Classic and the Canad Inns Prairie Classic) is an annual curling tournament, held in October at the Portage Curling Club in Portage la Prairie, Manitoba. It is part of the World Curling Tour. The purse for the event $60,000.  Except for the Grand Slam events, it is currently the men's WCT event with the highest purse.

Past champions

References

External links
Website

World Curling Tour events
Sport in Portage la Prairie
Curling in Manitoba